Don Cowie may refer to:

Don Cowie (footballer) (born 1983), Scottish footballer
Don Cowie (sailor) (born 1962), New Zealand Olympic sailor